The Children's Healthcare of Atlanta - Scottish Rite Hospital formerly Scottish Rite Hospital for Crippled Children is a nationally ranked, freestanding, 273-bed, pediatric acute care children's hospital located in Atlanta, Georgia. It is affiliated with the Emory University School of Medicine and the Morehouse School of Medicine, as a member of the Children's Healthcare of Atlanta system, 1 of 3 of the children's hospitals in the system. The hospital provides comprehensive pediatric specialties and subspecialties to infants, children, teens, and young adults aged 0–21 throughout the Atlanta region. The hospital features a state verified level II pediatric trauma center, one of two in the state. Its regional pediatric intensive-care unit and neonatal intensive care units serve the region. The hospital also has a rooftop helipad for critical pediatric transport.

History

Original location 

Scottish Rite Hospital was originally founded in 1915 at a different location, dedicated to caring for the region's crippled children, named the Scottish Rite Convalescent Home for Crippled Children. The hospital expanded early into their history with a 50-bed expansion taking place in 1919 with support from the Scottish Rite Freemasons.

In 1965 Scottish Rite expanded their pediatric services, becoming a full-service children's hospital. They also renamed the hospital to Scottish Rite Children's Hospital to reflect the expansion of services.

In 1971, the hospital moved to its current location in north Atlanta, Georgia leaving the original buildings unused and abandoned.

Current location 
The hospital opened the current location in July 1976. The new hospital contained 50 beds featuring as a four-bed pediatric intensive care unit, and later a 200-seat amphitheater was added to the hospital for medical teaching.

In 1983 Scottish Rite Children's Hospital again expanded with the addition of 96 patient beds and a new clinical outpatient building.

On September 15, 1989, the hospital was renamed to the Wilbur and Hilda Glenn Hospital for Children to honor the family that originally donated the land.

In 1998 the Scottish Rite Hospital merged with the Emory-affiliated Egleston Children's Hospital creating the large pediatric hospital system, the Children's Healthcare of Atlanta (CHOA), becoming the region's largest pediatric provider.

Scottish Rite underwent an additional expansion and renovation in 2004.

In 2006 CHOA and Grady Health System announced that an affiliate of CHOA would take control and assume responsibility for the management of services at Hughes Spalding Children's Hospital.

Awards 
As of 2021, Children's Healthcare of Atlanta (ranked with Egleston Children's Hospital) has placed nationally in all ten ranked pediatric specialties on U.S. News & World Report.

See also 
 List of children's hospitals in the United States
 Texas Scottish Rite Hospital for Children
 Arthur M. Blank Hospital
 Emory University School of Medicine
 Hughes Spalding Children's Hospital

References

External links 

 

Scottish Rite
Children's hospitals in the United States
Pediatric trauma centers
Hospital buildings completed in 1976
Teaching hospitals in Georgia (U.S. state)
Hospitals in Atlanta